Koutiala Airport   is an airstrip serving Koutiala in Mali.

Runway is poorly defined. Length is between last visible markers and is approximate.

References

External links
 HERE/Nokia Maps - Koutiala

Airports in Mali